The River Ock is a small English river which is a tributary of the River Thames. It has as its catchment area the Vale of White Horse, a low-lying and wide valley in south Oxfordshire, and flows into the River Thames, at Abingdon on the reach above Culham Lock.

Course
The River Ock rises near the village of Little Coxwell.  It collects tributaries from each village along the base of the White Horse Hills, where springs emanating from the chalk hills allowed settlements to flourish in former times. Among these tributaries is the Osse Stream, rising in Cumnor.

The name of Stanford comes from stony ford, possibly alluding to the Ock crossing at Stanford Mill. Thence it runs past Charney Bassett, Lyford, Garford and Marcham Mill, before losing its identity and its waters to the Thames at Abingdon by the old Hygienic Laundry building. An iron bridge crosses at the junction which was built by the Wilts & Berks Canal Company. This gives the erroneous impression that the Ock is that canal, but in fact the original canal entrance a few yards downstream is now blocked up. This has been replaced under a restoration project by a newer entrance closer to Culham Lock.

The soils through which the River Ock flows are the Jurassic sedimentary series (Greensands, Gault, Kimmeridge Clay and corallian limestone), while some of its tributaries arise in chalk springs. Until recent times, native crayfish and many freshwater fish species inhabited the river. Increased housing in the Vale, with the resultant surface drainage, may have threatened these species but surveys have not yet been performed in the 21st century.

Although normally placid, the Ock can flood low-lying areas of south Abingdon after persistent heavy rainfall; this last occurred in July 2007.

Name 
The hydronym Ock appears to be derived from a Celtic word for 'salmon'.

See also
Tributaries of the River Thames
List of rivers of England

References 

Ock, River
Ock, River
1Ock